Willy Edwin (born 4 December 1974), better known by his stage name Will Masterpiece, is a Malaysian rock musician best known as the co-founder and the primary lead guitarist of the Bornean hard rock band Masterpiece, with whom he achieved mainstream success in the late 2000s.  Edwin co-founded Masterpiece, formerly known as Masterjam with his brother Kennedy Edwin in 2003, and has since released five studio albums with the band. Like the other left-handed guitarist, Edwin had the instrument strung upside-down with the high E on the top.

Personal life
Willy Edwin was born on 4 December 1974 in Kanowit, and raised in the town of Sibu, Sarawak. He is married to his college sweetheart Ayuyahti A and blessed with four children.

Career

Masterpiece (2003–present)

Willy Edwin is a founding member of the Bornean hard rock band Masterpiece. He formed the band with his brother Kennedy Edwin (lead vocals/rhythm guitar) in 2003 along with Watt Marcus and Roni joining as bassist and drummer, respectively.

Discography
Masterpiece

 Merindang Ke Bintang (2009)
 Rock & Roll (2013)
 Ngap Sayot (2014)
 Ngarap Ka Nuan Nikal Pulai (2016)
 Ensera Paragon (2018)

Compilations & single
 "Mansau Leka Padi" (2011)
 "Berami Ba Ati Nuan" (2014)
 "Nadai Ati Berami" (2015)

References

1974 births
Living people
People from Sarawak
Malaysian rock musicians
Masterpiece (band) members
Iban people